Nattapoom Maya (born December 5, 1991) is a Thai professional footballer for the Thai League 2 club Nakhon Si United.

External links
 

1991 births
Living people
Nattapoom Maya
Association football forwards
Nattapoom Maya
Nattapoom Maya
Nattapoom Maya
Nattapoom Maya
Nattapoom Maya
Nakhon Si United F.C. players